Farnes is a surname. Notable people with the surname include:

Eleanor Farnes, British writer
Ken Farnes (1911–1941), English cricketer
Paul Farnes (1918–2020), British World War II flying ace
Richard Farnes (born 1964), British conductor

See also
Farnes Church, a church in Sogn og Fjordane, Norway